Ignacio Baz (1826–1887) was an Argentine painter who painted many portraits of notable people in the region during his lifetime.

Life 

Ignacio Baz was born in San Miguel de Tucumán in 1826 and died in 1887.  He was a disciple, alongside Fernando García del Molino and Eustaquio Carrandi, of the renowned painter Carlos Morel.

Work 

Baz portrayed great personalities in Tucumán, Córdoba, Buenos Aires, Santiago, Chile and Lima, Peru.
He also made portraits of caudillos such as Juan Manuel de Rosas, Juan Felipe Ibarra, Facundo Quiroga and Ángel Vicente Peñaloza.

When his niece offered a collection of his work for sale to state in 1904, the Senator for Tucumán Province, Alberto Soldati, spoke in favor of the purchase, saying 
Ignacio Baz was one of the greatest of national portrait artists.
His portraits, painted over a period of forty years, were striking resemblances of the most distinguished members of the leading families in the provinces of North and many of Cordoba and the coast".
His works may be seen at the Museum of Fine Arts Eduardo Sivori, shown by Rodolfo Trostiné (Buenos Aires) and the Museum of Fine Arts "Timoteo Eduardo Navarro" (City of Tucumán)

Gallery

References 

Citations

Sources

External links 
 Recopilación de obras en Catálogo Acceder
 Muestra de retratos realizados por el artista 
  Museos y Eventos Culturales de Tucumán

1826 births
1887 deaths
Argentine portrait painters
19th-century Argentine painters
19th-century Argentine male artists
Argentine male painters